Todd Durham is an American filmmaker, comedy writer, and novelist, best known as the creator of the concept for the Hotel Transylvania film franchise and as the creator of Lord Buckethead. Durham's works, including over forty screenplays and books, frequently combine fantasy storylines with character comedy.

Education and career 
Durham studied comedy writing at USC under brothers Danny Simon and Neil Simon.

Based on a half-hour 35mm film that he wrote and directed, a North Carolina movie studio signed Todd Durham to a three-picture feature deal. Durham then wrote and directed a low-budget comedy film, Hyperspace, starring Chris Elliott and Paula Poundstone. The film was the first appearance of the "intergalactic spacelord" Lord Buckethead, a persona used by several people to stand in British elections.  In 2017, Durham asserted his ownership of the character, and future incarnations have been authorized by him.

Durham signed with Rick Jaffa, then agent at William Morris, and worked as an uncredited script doctor on comedy projects.  He wrote screenplays for comedy actors, directors, and producers, the National Lampoon film franchise, and Saturday Night Live alumni.  Durham ghostwrote celebrity autobiographies, and authored his first novel, Mr. Smith Goes To Hell, and its screenplay.

Hotel Transylvania 
During his years as a studio script doctor, Durham came up with the concept of Hotel Transylvania and brought it to Sony Pictures Animation. The first film in the series, Hotel Transylvania, was released in 2012 with mixed reviews from critics.

References

External links 
 Todd Durham at Internet Movie Database
 Todd Durham at ToddDurham.com

American film directors
American animated film directors
American screenwriters
American comedy writers
American male novelists
American writers of young adult literature
American animators
American fantasy writers
American science fiction writers
20th-century American novelists
21st-century American novelists
Living people
Year of birth missing (living people)
Place of birth missing (living people)
Sony Pictures Animation people
20th-century American male writers
21st-century American male writers